Andrej Zdravič (born 2 February 1952 in Ljubljana) is a Slovenian independent filmmaker, sound and media artist. He was educated in Ljubljana, Algiers and Buffalo, receiving his BA (1975) and MA Degrees (1980) in Media Studies at the State University of New York, Buffalo. He was awarded a Slovenian Prešeren Foundation Award in 1999 and received an honorary award (Doctorate equivalent) for artistic achievement from University of Ljubljana in 2006.

Biography 

Zdravič has lived and worked in New York City in the years 1975–80 and in San Francisco during 1980–97. He was closely associated with the San Francisco Exploratorium, Museum of Science, Art & Human Perception, where he headed the Video Department and developed his video installation Water Waves-Time Horizon (Time-Horizon is a unique software controlled 8-channel audiovisual installation format), a permanent exhibit from 1993.

Zdravič’s works have been screened in over 150 one-man shows and presentations across USA and Europe; in retrospectives at the Anthology Film Archives (NYC), Centre Georges Pompidou (Paris), Cankar Centre / Slovenian Cinematheque (Ljubljana); in over 120 group shows and festivals, among others, in the United Arab Emirates, India, Brazil and Argentina, and broadcast on ARTE, KCET/PBS Los Angeles, ZDF, RAISAT, TV Slovenia – they were seen by more than 3 million viewers. Zdravič represented Slovenia at the World Expo ’98 in Lisbon and the Venice Biennale 1999.

In recent years, Zdravič’s significant body of work that has focussed on developing a unique cinematic form concentrating almost solely on audiovisual aspects of natural phenomena, has been cited in film theory publications examining the possibility of an ecocinematic form: Toward an Ecocinema by Scott MacDonald, 2004, Framing the World: Explorations in Ecocriticism and Film by Paula Willoquet-Maricondi, 2010, Ecocinema Theory and Practice  (2012) edited by Stephen Rust, Salma Monani and Sean Cubitt 

Zdravič has taught at the University of Wisconsin–Milwaukee and San Francisco State University and has been a Visiting Filmmaker at more than 30 others, including Stanford University, Royal College of Art London, Malmö University College, University College Falmouth in Cornwall, UK and the Academy of Fine Arts, Ljubljana.

Zdravič is the recipient of several awards, among others, the Western States Media Arts Fellowship, the National Science Foundation award (USA), and the Prešeren Fund Award (Slovenia, 1999).

In recent years Zdravič has been especially involved in an extensive feature film – sound and multi-screen installation project(s) – The Forest. The first realisation is The Forest – Time Triptych, 3-channel film, HD 5.1 sound installation. Camera, Editing, Sound Recording & Composition, Installation Concept and Development for this installation were all created by Zdravič.
The Forest − Time Triptych is a permanent exhibit at the Triglav National Park Information Centre − Dom Trenta, Slovenia since 17 September 2011.

Filmography 

All Films Film/Sound Producer, Writer, Director, Camera, Editing, Sound-Music Recording & Composition: Andrej Zdravi.

 Origin   2001 24’ sound 16mm/Betasp
 Obon   2001 6’ sound 16mm/Betasp
 Heartbeat   2000 9.5’ sound Betasp
 Riverglass (V steklu reke)   1997 41’ sound Betasp
 Tokyo Tsukiji   1994 13’ sound Betasp
 Ocean Beat   1990 60’ sound 16mm
 Restless   1987 12’ sound 16mm
 Kres (Bonfire)   1987 5’ sound 16mm
 Airborne   1987 10’ sound 16mm
 Air Trio   1985 18’ sound 16mm
 Anastomosis   1982 58’ sound 16mm
 Vsi Sveti (All Saints)   1981 5’ silent 16mm
 Vesuvio   1981 10’ silent 16mm
 Venezia   1981 7’ sound 16mm
 Currents   1979 13.5’ sound S-8mm/16mm
 Dom (Home)   1979 20’ sound S-8mm
 Via Sound   1978 24’ sound S-8mm
 New York Studies (I-V)   1977 37’ silent 16mm
 Breath   1976   7’ b&w sound 16mm
 Sunhopsoon   1976 7’ sound 16mm
 Carbon Arc   1975 8’ b&w sound 16mm
 Phenix   1975 14’ sound 16mm
 Waterbed   1974 5.5’ sound 16mm
 Camera Dances   1973 15’ sound S-8mm

Time Horizon video installations

The Time Horizon concept developed by Zdravič is a unique software controlled 8-channel audiovisual installation format.

 OCEAN LAVA   1999 30’ loop,
 SECRETS OF SOCA   1995–98 33’ loop
 WATER WAVES   1992–93  28’ loop

Selected commissions

 Nature and City   2006 15‘ sound hd/DVD
 Richard Serra at Oliver Ranch   1995  21’ sound Betasp
 Water Cycle   1994 14’ sound u-maticsp
 Extended Exploratorium   1990 14’ sound Betasp
 Microsurgical Transplantation (Vol. i-iv)    1982 110’ sound 16mm (produced with Harry J. Buncke, MD – the 'father of microsurgery)
 Present Status of Microsurgery in Hand Surgery  1981 29’ sound 16mm (produced with Harry J. Buncke, MD)

Screenings and exhibitions

Selected retrospectives

 Anthology Film Archives – a 3-day retrospective, New York City 2008
 Kinoteka (Slovenian Cinematheque) – Kino Integral, a 6-hour mini-retrospective, Ljubljana 2001
 Cankarjev Dom & Kinoteka – a 4-day retrospective, Ljubljana 1996
 Centre Georges Pompidou – a 3-day retrospective, Paris 1994
 Anthology Film Archives – a 2-day retrospective, New York City 1991
 Deutsches Filmmuseum – a 3-day retrospective, Frankfurt AM 1987

Permanent exhibitions
 National Museum of Natural Sciences – Water Waves, Taichung, Taiwan, from 1996–2005
 Kalamazoo Public Museum- Water Waves, Kalamazoo, Michigan, from 1996–2007
 Dom Trenta, Triglav National Park Inf. Center – Secrets of Soča -Time Horizon, Trenta, Slovenia, from 1995–present
 Exploratorium- Museum of Science, Art & Human Perception- Water Waves-Time Horizon, San Francisco 1993
 Obrazi Ljubljane – stalna razstava, (film-instalacija Narava & Mesto) Mestni muzej, Ljubljana 2007

References

External links 
 Andrej Zdravič's website

1952 births
Living people
Film people from Ljubljana
Slovenian film directors
Slovenian experimental filmmakers